Anolis trachyderma, the roughskin anole or common forest anole, is a species of lizard in the family Dactyloidae. The species is found in Colombia, Peru, Brazil, and Ecuador.

References

Anoles
Reptiles of Colombia
Reptiles of Peru
Reptiles of Brazil
Reptiles of Ecuador
Reptiles described in 1875
Taxa named by Edward Drinker Cope